= Quadrigia =

Medical condition

Quadrigia is a common misspelling of "Quadriga". Quadriga is a medical condition resulting in the inability to flex a finger adjacent to a finger with a previously injured flexor digitorum profundus (FDP) tendon. The pathophysiology is that the shortest of the FDP tendons to the long, ring, and small fingers determines their maximum excursion due to their common muscle belly.
